Umpqua or Umqua may refer to:

People
 Umpqua people, an indigenous people of present-day Oregon
Upper Umpqua language, the language of the Upper Umpqua people

Places
 Fort Umpqua, the name of two former military installations in Oregon
 Umpqua, Oregon, a community
 Umpqua City, Oregon, the former name of Winchester Bay, Oregon
 Umpqua Community College
 Umpqua County, Oregon, a former county
 Umpqua Hot Springs
 Umpqua National Forest
 Umpqua River
 Umpqua River Light
 Umpqua Valley AVA, a wine growing region

Other
 Umpqua Holdings Corporation (NASDAQ: UMPQ)
 Umpqua Community College shooting